Nosphistica parameocola is a moth in the family Lecithoceridae. It is found in Taiwan and southern China (Hainan).

References

Moths described in 1996
Moths of Asia
Moths of Taiwan
Nosphistica